Main Street, Zeehan is the main street of the Western Tasmanian town of Zeehan.

It was constructed in the late 1890s. 
The street was utilised by the tram service which passed along the street.

Most significant heritage properties of Zeehan were located in the street, and viewable in a single vista.

The West Coast Heritage Centre incorporates some of the original buildings including:
 Zeehan School of Mines and Metallurgy
 Gaiety Theatre
 Zeehan Post Office
 Zeehan Courthouse

Its Tasmanian road number is C248.

See also
 Orr Street, Queenstown

Notes

Zeehan
Roads in Western Tasmania